Colotis ungemachi is a butterfly in the family Pieridae. It is found in south-western Saudi Arabia, Yemen, north-eastern Ethiopia and possibly Sudan.

References

Butterflies described in 1922
ungemachi